Eric Ebang Zué (born 16 May 1971) is a Gabonese sprinter. He competed in the men's 4 × 100 metres relay at the 1996 Summer Olympics.

References

External links
 

1971 births
Living people
Athletes (track and field) at the 1996 Summer Olympics
Gabonese male sprinters
Olympic athletes of Gabon
Place of birth missing (living people)
21st-century Gabonese people